Ethoxyresorufin-O-deethylase (EROD) is used as a biomarker in fish bioassays through catalytic measurement of cytochrome p4501A1 induction.

References

Biomarkers
EC 1.14